Vetivazulene is an azulene derivate obtained from vetiver oil. It is a bicyclic sesquiterpene and an isomer of guaiazulene.

References

Azulenes
Sesquiterpenes